Claudia Tschöke (born 18 June 1978) is a German former footballer who played as a midfielder. She made eight appearances for the Germany national team from 1994 to 1996.

References

External links
 

1978 births
Living people
German women's footballers
Women's association football midfielders
Germany women's international footballers
Place of birth missing (living people)